Revsnes is a village in the municipality of Åfjord in Trøndelag county, Norway. The village is located on the mainland in the northwestern Stoksund area of Åfjord. Stoksund Church is located in Revsnes.

References

Villages in Trøndelag
Åfjord